The Hoodlum is a 1951 American film noir crime film directed by Max Nosseck and starring Lawrence Tierney, Allene Roberts, Marjorie Riordan and Lisa Golm.

Plot

Vincent Lubeck (Lawrence Tierney) is an habitual criminal from childhood, who has recently been released from prison on parole. He would not have gotten out had it not been for the pleas of his elderly mother. He gets a job working at his brother Johnny's gas station.  He seduces Rosa, his brother's fiancee who hopes to reform him but can't resist his determined advances, which he makes in part to show her it's not so easy to be good in a bad world.

Vincent becomes interested in the armored car that makes regular stops at the bank across the street. He romances Eileen, a beautiful independent-minded secretary at the bank, after the police detective who arrested him last time says she's out of his league.  At first he's just interested in the challenge, but realizing she knows a lot about the bank's inner workings, he starts pumping her for information.  She finds him fascinating, but is a lot tougher than Rosa. Vincent begins to plan a bank robbery, and to recruit men he knows from prison to pull the job with him. He shared a cell with a master bank job planner, and listened carefully to the man when he talked about how to make such an operation work.

Rosa comes to Vincent (who has lost interest in her), begging him to marry her—he refuses, and she jumps off the roof to her death. The autopsy reveals she was pregnant, which Vincent's mother finds out about.

Vincent comes up with a plan involving a fake funeral procession, allowing the gang to get past a police blockade.  With the money in hand (leaving several dead guards behind), the other heisters turn on the ill-tempered domineering Vincent, whose arrogance and inability to understand other people's points of view and anticipate their reactions, prevent him from spotting the betrayal and heading it off.  He's the only surviving member of the gang the police know about, due to his connection with the gas station, so they get away clean, to rob another day, splitting the money evenly between them. Vincent told them that as the planner, he deserved the biggest cut, but he ends up with nothing but a bump on his head, and an all-points bulletin out on him.

In desperation, with no resources, he turns to Eileen, but she produces a small handgun, and orders him to leave, fearing he'll implicate her.  His mother, now regretting her intervention on her son's behalf, curses him on her deathbed.  Johnny, knowing now what happened to Rosa, takes him at gunpoint to a local dump (the film opens with a flash forward of them driving there)--but can't bring himself to kill Vincent. The police, who somehow managed to follow them there undetected, end up finishing the job.

Cast
 Lawrence Tierney as Vincent Lubeck
 Allene Roberts as Rosa
 Marjorie Riordan as Eileen
 Lisa Golm as Mrs. Lubeck
 Edward Tierney as Johnny Lubeck
 Stuart Randall as Police Lt. Burdick
 Angela Stevens as Christie Lang
 John De Simone as Marty Connell
 Tom Hubbard as Police Sgt. Schmidt
 Eddie Foster as Mickey Sessions
 O.Z. Whitehead as Mr. Breckenridge
 Richard Barron as Eddie Bright
 Rudy Rama as Harry Hill
 Raymond Bond as Old Man (uncredited)
 James Conaty as Parole Officer W.D. Allen (uncredited)
 Bill Coontz as Gang Member (uncredited)
 Russell Custer as Police Officer (uncredited)
 Rudy Germane as Guard (uncredited)
 William H. O'Brien as Morgue Attendant (uncredited)
 Gene Roth	as Prison Warden Stevens (uncredited)

Reception

Critical response
Film critic Dennis Schwartz generally liked the film due to the work of actor Lawrence Tierney, writing, "The Hoodlum is a gangster film which passes for film noir because of the protagonist's dark nature, lack of loyalty and violent anti-social behavior ... The cheaply made film tells an old story and adds nothing fresh, but it was presented with force. Aside from Lawrence Tierney's finely tuned, menacing performance, and Lisa Golm's Oscar-worthy deathbed scene, the acting was sub par. It was Tierney's performance that kept the film alive in the tradition of the old-fashioned gangsters like those portrayed by Cagney and Robinson."

See also
 List of films in the public domain in the United States

References

External links

 
 
 
 
 
 The Hoodlum at Film Noir of the Week by author and professor Wheeler Winston Dixon
 The Hoodlum information site and DVD review at DVD Beaver (includes images)
  (public domain)

1951 films
1951 crime films
American crime films
American heist films
American black-and-white films
1950s English-language films
Film noir
Films directed by Max Nosseck
Eagle-Lion Films films
1950s heist films
1950s American films